Somatidia pulchella is a species of beetle in the family Cerambycidae. It was described by Olliff in 1889. It is known from Australia.

References

pulchella
Beetles described in 1889